Santeri Hatakka (born 15 January 2001) is a Finnish professional ice hockey defenceman for the Utica Comets of the American Hockey League (AHL) as a prospect to the New Jersey Devils of the National Hockey League (NHL).

Playing career
He was drafted in the sixth round, 184th overall, of the 2019 NHL Entry Draft by the San Jose Sharks. Hatakka made his professional and Liiga debut for Ilves during the 2019–20 season.

Hatakka was signed by the San Jose Sharks to a three-year, entry-level contract on 12 May 2021. Hatakka made his NHL debut for the Sharks on 30 October 2021, in a 2–1 win over the Winnipeg Jets. On 9 November, he recorded his first point, an assist, in a 4–1 win over the Calgary Flames.

On 26 February 2023, Hatakka was traded to the New Jersey Devils in a multi-player trade, which involved Timo Meier.

Career statistics

Regular season and playoffs

International

References

External links
 

2001 births
Living people
21st-century Finnish people
Finnish ice hockey defencemen
Ilves players
KOOVEE players
People from Riihimäki
San Jose Barracuda players
San Jose Sharks draft picks
San Jose Sharks players
Sportspeople from Kanta-Häme